Christopher "Christy" Robinson (1902 – 21 February 1954) was an Irish soccer player during the 1920s and 1930s.

Robinson was a skilful inside forward during this era in the League of Ireland and was part of the All-Conquering Bohemians team of 1927/28 who won every trophy on offer that season – League of Ireland, FAI Cup, Shield and Leinster Senior Cup. He holds the honour of scoring Bohemians' first ever goal in the FAI Cup when he netted the first in a 7–1 win over Athlone Town on 28 January 1922.

At international level, he was part of Ireland's squad at the Paris Olympic Games of 1924, but he did not play in any matches.

He was the brother of fellow Bohemian Jeremiah

Honours
League of Ireland
 Bohemians – 1927/28
FAI Cup
 Bohemians – 1928
League of Ireland Shield
 Bohemians – 1928
Represented Ireland in the 1924 Olympic Games

References

1902 births
1954 deaths
Bohemian F.C. players
League of Ireland players
Irish association footballers (before 1923)
Irish Free State association footballers
Republic of Ireland association footballers
Footballers at the 1924 Summer Olympics
Olympic footballers of Ireland
League of Ireland XI players
Association football midfielders